The British Columbia Terms of Union is an Order in Council of the Privy Council of the United Kingdom and forms part of the Constitution of Canada.

British Columbia joined Confederation and became the sixth province of Canada on July 20, 1871. The confederation agreement was based on terms of union negotiated in Ottawa between the Colony of British Columbia and the Dominion of Canada. The Terms of Union consists of 14 articles.

Negotiations and terms
For British Columbia, financial concerns were at the top of the list in negotiating union with Canada. Canada assumed BC's debts and liabilities, provided BC with a generous subsidy and an annual per capita grant, based on an inflated population figure. Canada also agreed to pay salaries of supreme court and county court judges, and pensions of colonial civil servants whose positions might be affected by the union with Canada. Other articles dealt with parliamentary representation, postal services, customs tariffs, interprovincial trade, lighthouses and facilities such as a quarantine station and penitentiary. The terms promised a transcontinental railway and a first-class graving dock for ship repair at Esquimalt. 

The Terms of Union also addressed Indian land policy in a manner that would effectively perpetuate BC's pre-Confederation practices, through "a policy as liberal as that hitherto pursued by the British Columbia Government shall be continued by the Dominion Government after the Union". Post union, Canada would learn that the policies of British Columbia with regard to lands and Indigenous peoples were not at all "liberal". This foundational ambiguity related to the Indian Land Question, settlement and occupation of unceded lands, is a defining characteristic of BC in Confederation and has ongoing implications for society and economy.

References

External links
 British Columbia Terms of Union, 1871

Law of Canada
Canadian constitutional case law